The 1951–52 Landsdelsserien was a Norwegian second-tier football league season, the first named Landsdelsserien.

The league was contested by 54 teams, divided into a total of seven groups from four districts; Østland/Søndre, Østland/Nordre, Sørland/Vestland and Møre/Trøndelag. The two group winners in the Østland districts, Larvik Turn and Lillestrøm promoted directly to the 1952–53 Hovedserien. The other five group winners qualified for promotion play-offs to compete for two spots in the following season's top flight. Varegg and Ranheim won the play-offs and were promoted.

Tables

District Østland/Søndre

District Østland/Nordre

District Sørland/Vestland

Group A1

Group A2

Group B

District Møre/Trøndelag

Møre

Trøndelag

Promotion play-offs
Sørland/Vestland 
Results A1–A2
Ålgård 2–0 Flekkefjord
Results A–B
Varegg 2–2 (a.e.t.) Ålgård
Varegg 2–1 Ålgård 

Varegg won 2–1 over Ålgård and were promoted to Hovedserien.

Møre/Trøndelag
Ranheim 2–0 Hødd

Ranheim won 2–0 over Hødd and were promoted to Hovedserien.

References

Norwegian First Division seasons
1951 in Norwegian football
1952 in Norwegian football
Norway